Golden Strip Career Center (GSCC) is one of four part-time secondary vocational schools in the Greenville County School District located in Greenville, South Carolina, United States. The school offers a variety of programs, each with a focus on some specific career field, and students can earn certifications, licenses, and even college credit following the completion of such programs. Most students at Golden Strip Career Center are also enrolled in non-alternative high schools in the school district; therefore, school bus transportation between these schools and the career center is provided on school days.

History
Golden Strip Career Center was named after "the Golden Strip," an informal collective title for the cities of Fountain Inn, Simpsonville, and Mauldin; though the school technically is addressed in Greenville, it is just outside of Mauldin.

The firefighting program at the school was established in January 2013.

On the morning of February 24, 2016, several buildings at the campus were damaged due to a windstorm. No people that were on campus at that time were hurt or injured.

Programs
Golden Strip Career Center offers the following programs:

 Automotive collision repair
 Automotive technology
 Animation and digital multimedia
 Building construction
 Cosmetology
 Culinary arts
 Early childhood education
 Firefighting
 HVAC
 Law, public safety, corrections, and security
 Logistics and business processes
 Machine tool technology
 Mechatronics
 Nail technology
 Welding

Events
On several occasions, Greenville County School District has held job fairs at the career center, due to a shortage in district employees such as bus drivers and janitors.

References

Public high schools in South Carolina
Schools in Greenville County, South Carolina
Vocational schools in South Carolina